Ulloa and Forest Side is a former light rail stop on the Muni Metro L Taraval line, located at the intersection of Ulloa street and Forest Side Avenue in the West Portal neighborhood of San Francisco, California. The stop opened with the first section of the L Taraval line on April 12, 1919, it closed in January 2022 as part of an effort to consolidate stops. L Taraval trains now serve a new stop at Ulloa and 14th Avenue, one block to the west. This stop did not have platforms; passengers waited on the sidewalk on the near side of the intersection.

Proposed changes 

In March 2014, Muni released details of the proposed implementation of their Transit Effectiveness Project (later rebranded MuniForward), which included a variety of stop changes for the L Taraval line. Ulloa and Forest Side was outside the scope of the project, but nearby Ulloa and 15th Avenue station was closed in February during early implementation of project elements. In January 2018, amid controversy over the potential removal of Taraval and 17th Avenue station, Muni released a revised proposal under which Ulloa and Forest Side would be moved one block west to Ulloa and 14th Avenue to compensate for the removal of the inbound stop at 15th Avenue and Taraval station. The SFMTA Board approved the plan in July 2018.

References

External links 
SFMTA: Ulloa St & Forest Side Ave inbound and outbound
SF Bay Transit (unofficial): Ulloa St & Forest Side Ave

Muni Metro stations
Railway stations in the United States opened in 1919
1919 establishments in California